Two-Fisted is a 1935 American comedy film directed by James Cruze, written by Sam Hellman, Francis Martin and Eddie Moran, and starring Lee Tracy, Roscoe Karns, Gail Patrick, Kent Taylor, Grace Bradley and Billy Lee. The film was released on October 4, 1935, by Paramount Pictures.

Plot

Cast 
Lee Tracy as Hap Hurley
Roscoe Karns as Chick Moran
Gail Patrick as Sue Parker
Kent Taylor as Clint Blackburn
Grace Bradley as Marie
Billy Lee as Jimmy Parker
G. P. Huntley as Major Fitz-Stanley
Akim Tamiroff as Taxi Driver
Gordon Westcott as George Parker
Samuel S. Hinds as Mr. Pritchard
Sarah Edwards as Abigail Adams
Lillian Leighton as Mrs. Mason
Ferdinand Munier as Jerry Mason
Irving Bacon as Brick Briggs

Reception
In a review for The New York Times, critic T.M.P. opined that Two-Fisted was antiquated in its humor, but praised Tracy's lead performance.

References

External links 
 

1935 films
1935 comedy films
American comedy films
1930s English-language films
American films based on plays
Films directed by James Cruze
Paramount Pictures films
American black-and-white films
1930s American films